Vlach (feminine Vlachová) is a Czech surname, a reference to Vlachs. Notable people with this surname include:

 Jaroslav Vlach (born 1992), Czech ice hockey player
 Josef Vlach, founder of the Vlach Quartet
 Karel Vlach (1911–1986),  Czech dance orchestra conductor and arranger
 Martin Vlach (electrical engineer), American engineer
 Martin Vlach (pentathlete), Czech modern pentathlete
 Miroslav Vlach (1935–2001), Czech ice hockey player
 Renata Vlachová, Czech orienteer
 Roman Vlach (born 1989), Czech ice hockey player

See also
Vlah (disambiguation)

Ethnonymic surnames
Czech-language surnames